Diaframma is an Italian band, one of the dark wave, gothic Italian acts to come out of Florence during the early 80s along with Litfiba. Diaframma originated from the meeting of punk - though it was starting to decline at the time -, new wave and rock.

History
Leader and co-founder of Diaframma is the poet, singer, guitarist and author Federico Fiumani.
Before Fiumani took the lead in 1989, the singer was Nicola Vannini, followed by Miro Sassolini, who recorded the first three Diaframma albums: Siberia, 3 Volte Lacrime and Boxe.  
 
Starting from the initial darkwave sound, the style of Diaframma began to shift toward punk rock. Fiumani took the lead and became the singer of the band. Through changes in the line-up of Diaframma over the years, several well-known Italian rock musicians recorded and toured with the band: Daniele Trambusti (drums, already working with Litfiba, Avida, Bella Band and many other Italian rock acts of the 80s and 90s), Alessandro Gerbi (drums, already working with CCCP Fedeli alla linea), Gianni Cerone (drums), Alessio Riccio (drums), Simone Giuliani, now a record producer and film composer living in New York City (keyboards and vocals), Alessandro Gherardi (keyboards), Guido Melis (bass), Riccardo "Foggy" Biliotti (bass).

Diaframma reached the status of cult band because of charismatic leader Federico Fiumani's statements and fierce lyrics. Fiumani more than once turned down major label deals and declined to participate to mainstream events such as the Sanremo Music Festival in order to preserve his artistic independence and maintain Diaframma's integrity.

The Italian alternative rock band C.F.F. e il Nomade Venerabile has dedicated to the leader of Diaframma a song called Fiumani, from the album Ghiaccio, released in 2004.

Discography

LP/CD

Singles, EP

Federico Fiumani album

References

External links 
 

Italian alternative rock groups
Musical groups from Florence